This is a timeline documenting events of Jazz in the year 1960.

Events

October
 16 – The Cannonball Adderley Quintet records At the Lighthouse at the Lighthouse Café in Hermosa Beach, California.

June
 30 – The 7th Newport Jazz Festival started in Newport, Rhode Island (June 30 – July 4).

Album releases

Art Blakey 
The Big Beat
A Night in Tunisia
Tina Brooks: True Blue
Betty Carter: The Modern Sound"
June Christy
"The Cool School"
"Off-Beat"
Ornette Coleman: "Change of the Century"
John Coltrane: Giant StepsEric Dolphy: Outward BoundGil Evans: Out of the Cool 
Jimmy Giuffre: Piece for Clarinet and String Orchestra/Mobiles 
Joe Harriott: Southern Horizons 
the Jazztet
"Big City Sounds"Meet the JazztetSam Jones: The Soul Society 
Duke Jordan: Flight to Jordan 
Stan Kenton: Road ShowHerbie Mann: Flute, Brass, Vibes and PercussionCharles Mingus: Charles Mingus Presents Charles MingusHank Mobley: Soul Station 
Modern Jazz QuartetPyramid European Concert 
Wes MontgomeryThe Incredible Jazz Guitar"Movin' Along"
Oliver Nelson: Taking Care of Business 
David Newman & James Clay: The Sound of the Wide Open Spaces!!!!Art Pepper: Gettin' TogetherMax Roach: We Insist!Charlie Rouse: Takin' Care of BusinessGeorge Russell
"George Russell Sextet at the Five Spot"Jazz in the Space Age Stratusphunk 
Gunther Schuller [John Lewis]: Jazz AbstractionsHorace Silver: Horace-Scope"
Jimmy Smith: Back at the Chicken Shack
Cecil Taylor: The World of Cecil Taylor 
Clark Terry: Color Changes 
Mel Tormé: Mel Tormé Swings Shubert Alley
Lennie Tristano: The New Tristano 
Fats Waller: Handful of Keys (released posthumously)
Randy Weston: Uhuru Afrika 
Phil Woods: Rights of Swing
John Wright: South Side Soul

Deaths

 April
 11 – Zilas Görling, Swedish saxophonist (born 1911).
 13 – Beverly Kenney, American singer (born 1932).

 June
 12 – Isidore Barbarin, American cornet and alto horn player (born 1871).

 July
 3 – Lee Collins, American trumpeter (born 1901).
 5 – Bill Johnson, American saxophonist, clarinetist, and arranger (born 1912).
 30 – Arv Garrison, American guitarist (born 1922).

 August
 Jimmy Bertrand, American drummer (born 1900).

 September
 8 – Oscar Pettiford, American upright bassist, cellist, and composer (born 1922).
 24 – Mátyás Seiber, Hungarian-born composer (born 1905).

 October
 10 – June Cole, American bassist, tubist, and singer (born 1903).

 November
 24 – Edgar Meyer, American bassist, multi-instrumentalist, and composer.

 Unknown date
 Lawrence Duhé, clarinetist, and bandleader (born 1887).

Births

 January
 1 – Liu Yuan, Chinese saxophonist.
 3 – Marla Glen, American singer.
 8
 Dave Weckl, American drummer.
 Lee Tomboulian, American pianist.
 16
 Richard Elliot, Scottish-American saxophonist.
 Wilhelm Schröter, Brazilian composer and pianist.
 20 – Jeff "Tain" Watts, American drummer.
 26 – María Rivas, Venezuelan singer.
 29 – David Piltch, Canadian bassist and session musician.

 February
 3 – Craig Bailey, American saxophonist, flautist, and clarinetist.
 11 – Russ Freeman, American guitarist.
 29 – Khaled, Algerian singer, multti-instrumentalist, and songwriter.

 March
 2 – Lennart Ginman, Danish bassist, composer, and music producer.
 15 – Ugonna Okegwo, German-Nigerian upright bassist and composer.
 19 – Eliane Elias, Brazilian pianist and vocalist.
 21 – Dominic Miller, Argentinian guitarist and composer, Sting.
 25 – Chad Wackerman, American drummer.
 26 – Nelson Rangell, American saxophonist and composer.
 27 – Victor Bailey, American bassist.
 29 – Chano Domínguez, Spanish pianist.

 April
 1 – Banjo Mosele, Botswanan guitarist, singer and composer.
 3 – Erik Truffaz, French trumpeter.
 6 – John Pizzarelli, American guitarist, vocalist,  and songwriter.
 17 – Daniele Sepe, Italian saxophonist and flautist.
 20 – John Altenburgh, American pianist, composer and arranger.
 24 – Friðrik Karlsson, Icelandic guitarist and songwriter.
 25 – Mário Laginha, Portuguese piano player and composer.
 28 – Rolf Graf, Norwegian bassist (died 2013).
 30
 Paul Taylor, American saxophonist.
 Rodney Kendrick, American pianist, bandleader, composer, and producer.

 May
 3 – Alan Thomson, Scottish bassist and vocalist.
 12 – Lena Willemark, Swedish singer.
 14 – Alec Dankworth, English bassist and composer.
 20 – Tore Brunborg, Norwegian saxophonist.
 24 – Ken Schaphorst, American composer, performer and educator.
 25 – Wallace Roney, American trumpeter.

 June
 4 – Fred Thelonious Baker, English guitarist and bass guitarist.
 8
 Povl Erik Carstensen, Danish comedian, actor, and upright bassist.
 Terje Gewelt, Norwegian upright bassist.
 14 – Gary Husband, English drummer, pianist, and bandleader.
 19 – Carmen Bradford, American singer, Count Basie Orchestra.
 20 – Jeremy Monteiro, Singaporean pianist, singer, and composer.
 22 – Arturo O'Farrill, Mexican pianist and composer.
 23 – Donald Harrison, American saxophonist.
 26 – Zachary Breaux, American guitarist (died 1997).

 July
 8 – Valarie Pettiford, American actress, dancer, and jazz singer.
 14 – Angélique Kidjo, Beninese singer-songwriter and activist.
 15 – Stig Hvalryg, Norwegian upright bassist.
 20 – Ole Jacob Hystad, Norwegian tenor saxophonist and clarinetist.
 27 – Jean Toussaint, American tenor and soprano saxophonist.

 August
 3 – Greg Osby, American saxophonist.
 12 – Andy Quin, British composer and pianist.
 14 – Lloyd Swanton, Australian upright bassist, bass guitarist, and composer.
 17 – Maria Pia De Vito, Italian singer, composer and arranger.
 21
 Peter Apfelbaum, American pianist, tenor saxophonist, drummer and composer.
 Tom Kennedy, American bassist.
 26
 Branford Marsalis, American saxophonist, composer, and bandleader.
 Jim Beard, American keyboardist.
 27 – Eldad Tarmu, American vibraphonist and composer.

 September
 4 – Lonnie Plaxico, African-American upright bassist.
 8 – Steve Waterman, British trumpeter, composer, and educator.
 16 – Graham Haynes, American cornetist, trumpeter and composer.
 18 – Nils Petter Molvær, Norwegian trumpeter, composer, and producer, Masqualero.
 21 – Mats Rondin, Swedish cellist and conductor (died 2014).

 October
 2 – Django Bates, British composer, pianist, multi-instrumentalist and band leader.
 9 – Kenny Garrett, American saxophonist and flautist.
 10 – John Beasley, American pianist.
 13 – Orphy Robinson, British vibraphonist and multi-instrumentalist.
 15 – Henrik Bolberg Pedersen, Danish trumpeter and flugelhorn player
 16 – Leila Pinheiro, singer and pianist.
 25 – Michel Massot, Belgian tubist and trombonist.
 29 – Jens Winther, Danish trumpeter, composer, and bandleader (died 2011).

 November
 4 – Adrián Iaies, Argentine pianist and composer.
 5 – Daryl Hayott, American drummer, bassist, percussionist, keyboardist, and trumpeter.
 15 – Sergio Cammariere, Italian singer-songwriter.
 23 – Jean-Paul Bourelly, American guitarist.
 27 – Maria Schneider, American arranger, composer, and big-band leader.

 December
 1 – Chris Standring, British guitarist.
 5 – Brian Bromberg, American bassist and producer.
 7 – Matthew Shipp, American pianist, composer, and bandleader.
 12 – Sebi Tramontana,  Italian trombonist.
 16 – Mike Fahn, American trombonist.
 19 – Laurent de Wilde, French pianist, composer, and writer.
 28 – Ted Nash, American saxophonist and composer.

 Unknown date
 Lekan Babalola, Nigerian singer and percussionist.
 Mark Ledford, American trumpet player, vocalist and guitarist (died 2004).
 Muriel Anderson, American composer, guitarist, and harp-guitarist.
 Paul Taylor (saxophonist), American saxophonist.
 Pharez Whitted, American trumpeter.
 Tino di Geraldo, French-Spanish percussionist, tabla player, drummer, and producer.
 Umberto Petrin, Italian pianist, composer, and poet.

See also

 1960s in jazz
 List of years in jazz
 1960 in music

References

External links 
 History Of Jazz Timeline: 1960 at All About Jazz

Jazz
Jazz by year